George H. Miller is an American architect and a former partner of Pei Cobb Freed & Partners Architects LLP, the firm founded by I.M. Pei, Eason H. Leonard, and Henry N. Cobb.

Born in Berlin in 1949, he was president of the American Institute of Architects in 2010.

References

External links
Biography on company website, Pei Cobb Freed & Partners, retrieved September 26, 2015

1949 births
Living people
American architects
Presidents of the American Institute of Architects
Fellows of the American Institute of Architects